Aaron Muss  (born December 15, 1994) is an American snowboarder and racing driver.
 
He competed in the 2013 and 2017 FIS Snowboard World Championships, and in the 2018 Winter Olympics, in parallel giant slalom.

References

External links

1994 births
Living people
American male snowboarders
Olympic snowboarders of the United States
Snowboarders at the 2018 Winter Olympics
21st-century American people

Bryan Herta Autosport drivers
Michelin Pilot Challenge drivers